The 2017 Liga Profesional de Primera División season, also known as the Campeonato Uruguayo 2017, was the 114th season of Uruguay's top-flight football league, and the 87th in which it is professional. Nacional were the defending champions. Peñarol were the champions after winning the Torneo Clausura and defeating Apertura winners Defensor Sporting at the championship playoff via penalty shoot-out.

Format
The season was played under the Apertura-Clausura format, with the Apertura being played from February to May and the Clausura from August to November, and the inclusion of an additional tournament between the Apertura and Clausura named Torneo Intermedio and played from May to July. In the Intermedio, the 16 teams were split into two groups of eight with each club facing the others in their group once, and both group winners played the final. All three tournaments of the season counted for the aggregate table. If the best team in the aggregate table did not win the Apertura or Clausura, it would have gained a berth to the finals, but if one team won both tournaments it would automatically win the championship. The worst three teams in the relegation table were relegated, taking into account the 2016 and 2017 seasons. Also, the Torneo Intermedio winners would qualify for the 2018 Copa Sudamericana in case they failed to secure an international berth at the end of the season.

Teams

Torneo Apertura

Standings

Results

Top goalscorers

Source: Soccerway

Torneo Intermedio
The Torneo Intermedio was played between the Apertura and Clausura tournaments, and consisted of two groups of eight teams whose composition depended on the final standings of the Torneo Apertura: teams in odd-numbered positions played in Serie A, while teams in even-numbered positions played in Serie B. In each group, teams played each other once, and both group winners played the Torneo Intermedio final, with its winner being assured of a Copa Sudamericana berth in case it failed to qualify for CONMEBOL competitions through the aggregate table. The Intermedio winner also had the chance to play the Supercopa Uruguaya against the Primera División champion.

Serie A

Serie B

Torneo Intermedio Final

Top goalscorers

Source: Soccerway

Torneo Clausura

Standings

Results

Top goalscorers

Source: Soccerway

Aggregate table

Aggregate table playoff

Since Peñarol and Defensor Sporting ended the season tied in points, a playoff was played to determine the aggregate table first-placed team. The winners qualified for the Championship playoff finals.

Championship playoff

Semi-final

Peñarol won 4–2 on penalties.

Final
Since Peñarol, who had the best record in the aggregate table, won the semifinal, they became champions automatically and the final was not played. Defensor Sporting became runners-up as the second-placed team in the aggregate table. Both teams qualified for the 2018 Copa Libertadores group stage.

Top goalscorers

Source: Tenfield

Relegation
Relegation is determined at the end of the season by computing an average of the number of points earned per game over the four most recent tournaments: 2016 Transición and this season's three tournaments (Apertura, Intermedio, and Clausura). The three teams with the lowest average were relegated to the Segunda División for the following season.

Relegation playoff

Since El Tanque Sisley and Sud América ended with the same average, a playoff (by points) between both teams was played to determine the third relegated team. If both teams were tied in points after the second leg, an extra match would be played. The loser was relegated to the Segunda División.

Notes

References

External links
Asociación Uruguaya de Fútbol - Campeonato Uruguayo 

2017
1
2017 in South American football leagues